Shaman (Dr. Michael Twoyoungmen) is a fictional superhero appearing in American comic books published by Marvel Comics. The character is usually depicted as a member of Alpha Flight.

Publication history

Shaman was created by John Byrne and first appeared in Uncanny X-Men in the 120th issue of the comic in April 1979.

Fictional character biography
Michael Twoyoungmen is from Calgary, Alberta and is a member of Canada's First Nations (specifically the Tsuu T'ina).

His grandfather, elderly and near death, asks him to become his mystical apprentice. Twoyoungmen, not believing in magic, refuses. At around the same time, his wife Kathryn Twoyoungmen becomes terminally ill. Twoyoungmen desperately seeks a cure but, despite promising his daughter Elizabeth he would find one, Kathryn dies; his grandfather passes away on the very same day.

Grief-stricken, Twoyoungmen secludes himself in a cabin in Banff National Park, leaving Elizabeth to be raised by family friends the McNeils (whose daughter Heather will one day become Alpha Flight leader Vindicator). Twoyoungmen's failure to save Kathryn kindles a deep-seated resentment and anger in Elizabeth. In his cabin, Twoyoungmen receives the skull of his grandfather and experiences a vision of the man. Twoyoungmen studies Sarcee magic, eventually becoming strong enough in his beliefs to draw mystical items from his enchanted medicine bag at will. He adopts the title and regalia of a shaman.

Several years later, Shaman assists in the birth of Snowbird, the product of a mystical union between a human and the Inuit goddess Nelvanna. Shaman casts spells to bind Snowbird to the Earthly realm. He raises her and she ages rapidly, stabilizing several weeks later at an apparent physical age of someone in their 20s. Seeking superhuman agents to join Alpha Flight, Heather and her husband James Hudson (aka Alpha Flight founder Guardian) visit Shaman and recruit both him and Snowbird.

A few years after Shaman joins Alpha Flight, his daughter Elizabeth discovers a skull at an archeological site and experiences a vision of Ranaq the Devourer, one of the Great Beasts. She summons her father— who she knows is Shaman despite his use of spells to conceal his identity—to examine the skull. The two then meet Lucas Strang and his great-granddaughter Emily. Emily is possessed by Ranaq and attempts to destroy Elizabeth, but instead activates her latent mystical powers, allowing Elizabeth to defeat the possessed woman. Shaman has Elizabeth reach into his medicine bag and withdraw the Coronet of Enchantment, a mystical circlet which she dons to become Talisman, a prophesied person of great mystical power. Shaman does not tell Talisman that the Coronet, once donned, cannot be removed without causing her intense agony. Shortly thereafter, Talisman is trapped in the pocket dimension contained within Shaman's medicine bag despite his promise that he will save her. Although she is later rescued by the Beyonder, this newest failed promise turns her resentment of Shaman into hatred.

Shaman's failure to save his daughter leads to a crisis of faith and Shaman is unable to draw mystical items from his medicine bag. Shaman embarks on a vision quest and learns anew the secrets of mysticism from the spirit of his grandfather. Shaman gains the power to beseech nature spirits for aid, although he can not command them as Elizabeth does. He also receives a staff and an eagle helm, which can transform into a familiar spirit.

When a pregnant Snowbird is about to give birth to her first child and the birth needs to happen at a place of power, Shaman beseeches the spirits to lead him to such a place. However, Talisman, corrupted by her power and fueled by her rage, compels the spirits to unknowingly lead Shaman and Alpha Flight to a place of evil instead. Snowbird's child is possessed by the spirit of a sailor who has lain under the permafrost for over a century. Calling himself Pestilence, he battles Alpha Flight. Talisman plans to allow Pestilence to defeat Alpha Flight and then step in to defeat him, humiliating her father. However, Talisman is unable to defeat Pestilence as he is only partially of the spirit world, having been preserved in ice, and is thus outside the influence of her powers. As they fight, he tears the Coronet of Enchantment from her brow. Shocked back to her senses, Elizabeth is devastated over what she has done and apologizes to her father. Shaman, believing it is the only way to save Alpha Flight, dons the Coronet and takes on the mantle and powers of Talisman. Shaman, who grew cold and distant as Talisman just as Elizabeth had, eventually relinquishes the Coronet to Elizabeth and takes up his original medicine bag and powers again. He continues to work with Alpha Flight again under the name Shaman.

Much later, time-displaced versions of Alpha Flight are brought forward in time and remain in the present, assuming the mantle of Alpha Flight while the original Alpha Flight depart Earth to return a clutch of Plodex eggs to the Plodex homeworld.

Shaman, along with Major Mapleleaf II, both Pucks, Guardian, and Vindicator, is brutally attacked by the Collective. Their bodies are left in the Yukon Territory as the Collective continues on to the United States. Shaman is later confirmed dead by Sasquatch.

During the "Chaos War" storyline, Shaman (alongside Guardian, Vindicator, and Marrina Smallwood) is among the heroes who return from the dead after what happened to the death realms due to Amatusu-Mikaboshi's rampage through the Underworld. He ends up with a reunited Alpha Flight as they once again fight the Great Beasts. Shaman remains among the living after the defeat of the Chaos King.

Shaman later represented the Canadian government when he attended Black Panther's meeting in the Eden Room of Avengers Mountain.

Powers and abilities
During his initial training with the spirit of his grandfather, Shaman underwent intensive physical and mental training and discipline. He gained the understanding of the Sacree medicine men was able to concentrate to the point of not just thinking of objects, but feeling or knowing them in order to draw them out of his medicine pouch. He was also able to run at full speed through the forest without disturbing the wildlife that lived there.

Shaman, as a fully trained doctor, also has knowledge of anatomy and intricate surgical and medical procedures. Before his training as a mystic, he was referred to as the best surgeon in Canada. Due to his training, he recognized that his grandfather's skull had had the flesh boiled from it.

Shaman is a magic-wielder who carries a medicine bag which contains a pocket dimension known as the Void. He can summon all manner of physical and mystical objects and potions from the bag.

Following his vision quest, Shaman gains the power to beseech spirits to fulfill his requests. He cannot force the spirits to obey. In this incarnation, Shaman carries a "spirit staff," which glows when he summons the spirits. He wears an "eagle helm," which can transform into an eagle which serves as his familiar spirit.

Shaman can levitate by manipulating ambient mystical energy, but cannot fly.

When Shaman takes on the role of Talisman, he acquires the power to command natural spirits to do his will. He can manipulate vast mystical energy for a wide variety of effects. He has since relinquished these powers.

Other versions
Ultimate Shaman appears at a friendly baseball game with other Alpha Flight members in Ultimate X-Men #94. This version of Shaman is a mutant who possesses enhanced strength, speed, agility, and senses which have been enhanced through the drug Banshee instead of the magical abilities of his Marvel Universe counterpart. This version of Shaman is an alternate version of John Proudstar instead of Michael Twoyoungmen.

In other media
Shaman appears in the X-Men: The Animated Series episode "Repo Man" voiced by Don Francks. He is shown as a member of Alpha Flight.

References

External links
 AlphaFlight.Net Alphanex Entry on Shaman
 UncannyXmen.net Spotlight on Shaman

Canadian superheroes
Characters created by John Byrne (comics)
Comics characters introduced in 1979
Fictional characters from Alberta 
Fictional First Nations people
Fictional physicians
Fictional shamans
Fictional surgeons
Marvel Comics characters who use magic
Marvel Comics superheroes